Lewis Baldwin Parsons Jr. (April 5, 1818 – March 16, 1907) was one of the last officers who was promoted to brigadier general of volunteers in the Union Army during the American Civil War.

Early life and career
Lewis B. Parsons, Jr. was born at Perry, New York, on April 5, 1818. Parsons College was named after his father Lewis B. Parsons Sr.  His grandfather, Charles Parsons, had been an officer in the American Revolutionary War. In early life, Lewis B. Parsons, Jr. graduated from Yale College in 1840, was a teacher, and graduated from Harvard Law School in 1844. He practiced law in Alton, Illinois. In 1854, he moved to St. Louis, Missouri, where he became president of the Ohio and Mississippi Railway.

Civil war
Parsons began his service as a captain and assistant quartermaster on October 31, 1861. He was an aide-de-camp to then Missouri Militia Brigadier General Francis Preston Blair, Jr. in 1861. He was in charge of rail and river transport in the Department of the Missouri from December 1861 to March 11, 1862. He was appointed colonel in the Regular Army and aide-de-camp to Major General Henry Halleck February 19, 1862. He was in charge of rail and river transport in the Department of Mississippi, March 11, 1862, to September 11, 1862. Parsons was appointed aide-de-camp to Major General Samuel Ryan Curtis September 19, 1862, and in charge of rail and river transport in the Army of the Tennessee from September 1862 to December 1863. Parsons then was appointed aide-de-camp to Major General John M. Schofield July 10. 1863. He was in charge of rail and river transport in the Military Division of the Mississippi from December 1863 to August 2, 1864. Parsons was appointed Colonel, Quartermaster, August 2, 1864, to May 12, 1865. Parsons was in charge of river and rail transport in the Department of the Ohio from January 12, 1865, to April 30, 1866.

On May 11, 1865, President of the United States Andrew Johnson appointed Parsons brigadier general of volunteers, to rank from May 11, 1865, but Johnson did not submit a nomination for confirmation of the appointment to the United States Senate until January 13, 1866. The U.S. Senate confirmed the appointment on February 23, 1866. Parsons was mustered out of the volunteers on April 30, 1866.

Death and interment
After the war, Parsons lived in Flora, Illinois, where he was a banker. Lewis B. Parsons, Jr. died on March 16, 1907, at Flora, Illinois. He was buried at Bellefontaine Cemetery, St. Louis, Missouri.

Legacy
Parsons work as an officer in the Army quartermaster corps

See also

List of American Civil War generals (Union)

References

External links
 New York Civil War Internet page 
 History of Parson's College
 Short Biography

1818 births
1907 deaths
Harvard Law School alumni
People of Missouri in the American Civil War
Union Army generals
People from Perry, New York
People from Alton, Illinois
People from Flora, Illinois
Military personnel from Illinois